Palais de la Bourse may refer to the Palais de la Bourse in:
 Paris
 Brussels
 Lyon
 Marseille
 Nantes